Eumaeus is a genus of butterflies in the family Lycaenidae.

Selected species
Eumaeus atala (Poey, 1832) – Atala – Bahamas, Cuba, Isla de Juventud 	 
Eumaeus toxea (Godart, 1824) – Mexican cycadian – eastern and western Mexico to Nicaragua (southern Texas as very rare stray)
Eumaeus childrenae (G. Gray, 1832) – great cycadian – [= debora], eastern and southern Mexico to Honduras 
Eumaeus godartii  (Boisduval, 1870) – white-tipped cycadian – Nicaragua to western Ecuador 
Eumaeus minyas (Hübner, [1809]) – Minyas cycadian – Colombia to Peru and central Brazil
Eumaeus toxana (Boisduval, 1870) Venezuela to Bolivia

References

External links

Eumaeus
Butterflies of North America
Butterflies of Central America
Butterflies of the Caribbean
Lycaenidae of South America
Lycaenidae genera
Taxa named by Jacob Hübner